Chaetostoma niveum is a species of catfish in the family Loricariidae. It is native to South America, where it occurs in the Jurubidá River basin in the Chocó Department in Colombia. The species reaches 9.1 cm (3.6 inches) SL.

References 

niveum
Fish described in 1944